David Ellis Dickerson is an American author, humorist and contributor to National Public Radio's This American Life. Dickerson worked at Hallmark as a greeting card writer and is the unofficial Greeting Card Laureate of National Public Radio. He is creator of the web series Greeting Card Emergency, on which he writes greeting cards for unusual situations. He has also contributed to The Atlantic.

As of November 2015, he lives in Tallahassee, Florida, having moved from his native Tucson, Arizona. He also lived in New York City and Hollywood, California. He is an atheist.

Books 
House of Cards: The True Story of How a 26-Year-Old Fundamentalist Virgin Learned about Life, Love, and Sex by Writing Greeting Cards, Riverhead Trade, 
How Tolkien Sucks, Amazon Digital Services, Inc., ASIN: B009BHJGT4
 The Exy Book: Modern Myths of a Scandalous Goddess, Amazon Digital Services, Inc., ASIN: B007A2KFK6

References

External links 
 This American Life Contributors: David Ellis Dickerson
 Books by David Ellis Dickerson
 Official website

American humorists
American male writers
Living people
This American Life people
American atheists
Year of birth missing (living people)